Suriya Chiarasapawong (born 7 August 1949) is a former Thai cyclist. He competed in the sprint and 1000 time trial events at the 1972 Summer Olympics.

References

External links
 

1949 births
Living people
Suriya Chiarasapawong
Suriya Chiarasapawong
Cyclists at the 1972 Summer Olympics
Place of birth missing (living people)
Suriya Chiarasapawong